Richard Merriwell Errickson (March 5, 1912 – November 28, 1999), nicknamed "Lief", was a professional baseball player who played pitcher in the Major Leagues in 1938–42 playing for the Boston Bees/Braves and Chicago Cubs.

A native of Vineland, New Jersey, Errickson attended Vineland High School. He died in Vineland in 1999, aged 87.

References

External links

1912 births
1999 deaths
Major League Baseball pitchers
Boston Braves players
Chicago Cubs players
Baseball players from New Jersey
People from Vineland, New Jersey
Sportspeople from Cumberland County, New Jersey
Vineland High School alumni
Nazareth Barons players